Criorhina interrupta is a species of hoverfly in the family Syrphidae.

Distribution
Pakistan.

References

Eristalinae
Diptera of Asia
Insects described in 1923
Taxa named by Enrico Adelelmo Brunetti